The Real Housewives of Miami (abbreviated RHOM) is an American reality television series that premiered on Bravo on February 22, 2011, then revived on Peacock on December 16, 2021. Developed as the seventh installment of The Real Housewives franchise, it focuses on the personal and professional lives of several women living in Miami, Florida. Its first run consists of three seasons, with its second run consisting of two seasons and counting.

The current fifth-season cast consists of Guerdy Abraira, Lisa Hochstein, Julia Lemigova, Nicole Martin, Alexia Nepola and Larsa Pippen, with Kiki Barth, Adriana de Moura and Marysol Patton serving as friends of the housewives. Previously featured cast members include original housewives Lea Black and Cristy Rice; and subsequent housewives Joanna Krupa, Ana Quincoces and Karent Sierra.

Overview and casting

Seasons 1–3 
On March 10, 2010, Bravo announced the series Miami Social Club had been picked up as a restructuring of the 2009 series, Miami Social. After filming completed, Bravo decided to make it an installment of the network's The Real Housewives franchise. The first season premiered on February 22, 2011, and starred Lea Black, Adriana de Moura, Alexia Nepola, Marysol Patton, Larsa Pippen and Cristy Rice. Pippen and Rice left after the first season.

Lisa Hochstein, Joanna Krupa, Karent Sierra, and Ana Quincoces were added to the cast for the second season, which premiered on September 13, 2012. Nepola was demoted to a recurring role in order to spend more time to care for her son, injured in a 2011 car accident.

The third season debuted on August 12, 2013, with Nepola returning as a full-time housewife, while Patton and Quincoces were demoted to recurring capacity.  Sierra appeared as a guest. By September 2016, Bravo stated that The Real Housewives of Miami had "ended", making the franchise the second to end after The Real Housewives of D.C. was cancelled in 2010 after one season.

Season 4–present 
In November 2020, The Real Housewives executive producer Andy Cohen said that there were talks to return the show for a fourth season on the streaming service Peacock. In February 2021, the series was confirmed to be making a return. Shortly after the announcement, previous cast members Joanna Krupa and Lea Black both stated that they were not interested in appearing on the new season.

In October 2021, Peacock confirmed season 4 would premiere in December 2021 with returning housewives Lisa Hochstein, Alexia Nepola and Larsa Pippen being joined by Guerdy Abraira, Julia Lemigova and Nicole Martin. It was also announced that Adriana de Moura and Marysol Patton would return as friends of the housewives with Kiki Barth also joining as a friend. The season aired on Bravo in April 2022.

In October 2022, Peacock confirmed season five would premiere in December 2022, with the entire season four cast returning, and Lea Black making a guest appearance. On October 16, 2022, the trailer for the fifth season premiered at BravoCon and revealed a premiere date of December 8, 2022 exclusively on Peacock. The first four episodes premiered on Thursday, December 8 with new episodes dropping weekly thereafter for a total of 19 episodes.

Timeline of cast members

Episodes

Havana Elsa

While season two of The Real Housewives of Miami was airing, Bravo released a web series titled Havana Elsa. The series featured Elsa Patton, the mother of full-time cast member, Marysol Patton, embarking on launching her own coffee line, also titled Havana Elsa. The web series aired a total of 9 episodes.

Reception

Ratings

References

External links
 
 

 
2010s American reality television series
2020s American reality television series
2011 American television series debuts
2013 American television series endings
2021 American television series debuts
American television series revived after cancellation
English-language television shows
Television shows set in Miami
Bravo (American TV network) original programming
Peacock (streaming service) original programming
Women in Florida